The badminton competitions at the 2018 African Youth Games in Algiers, Algeria was held between 19 and 25 July at the Salle Protection-Civile de Dar El-Beïda.

Medal summary

Medal table

References

External links 
 African Youth Games at the www.tournamentsoftware.com

Badminton
African Youth Games
African Youth Games
African Youth Games